Through Time and Mystery – Ending is the sixth album by the German electronic composer Peter Frohmader, released independently in 1988.

Track listing

Personnel 
Adapted from the Through Time and Mystery – Ending liner notes.
Peter Frohmader – electronics, production, engineering, mixing, illustrations, cover art
Hellmut Neukirch – painting

Release history

References

External links 
 Through Time and Mystery – Ending at Discogs (list of releases)

1988 albums
Peter Frohmader albums